...And Justice for All may refer to:

 The last four words of the Pledge of Allegiance, an expression of loyalty to the country and flag of the United States of America
 ...And Justice for All (film), a 1979 film by Norman Jewison
 ...And Justice for All (album), a 1988 album by Metallica
 "...And Justice for All" (song), the album's title track
 The motto of the Campaign for Human Rights in the Philippines
 "And Justice For All" (Batwoman), an episode of Batwoman

See also
Justice for All (disambiguation)